During the 2006–07 English football season, Southend United F.C. competed in the Football League Championship.

Season summary
Southend United started the season reasonably well, beating Stoke City 1–0 on the opening day and defeating Sunderland 3–1 at Roots Hall several games later. After that, Southend did not win a league game for 18 games until 9 December when they beat Southampton 2–1. Southend followed this with a convincing 3–1 win over promotion-chasing West Bromwich Albion; on New Year's Day, in defeating Cardiff City 1–0 thanks to Lee Bradbury's 30-yard volley, Southend picked up their first away victory of the season and stretched their unbeaten run to five games. A 3–1 victory away to Birmingham City on 31 January saw the Shrimpers lift themselves from the bottom of the Championship, moving above Leeds United on goal difference. Southend finally pulled themselves out of the relegation zone on 13 March when Richie Foran came off the bench to score his first Southend United goal in the sixth minute of injury time, giving the Shrimpers a 1–0 victory over Burnley.

Regrettably, the form did not last and, after a humiliating 3–0 home defeat to local rivals Colchester United, the Shrimpers were relegated back to League One.

Southend pulled one of the shocks of the season when they defeated eventual champions and reigning cup holders Manchester United (whose starting lineup featured the likes of Cristiano Ronaldo and Wayne Rooney) 1–0 at Roots Hall in the League Cup, Freddy Eastwood netting after 27 minutes to send the Shrimpers through to the quarter-finals, against Tottenham Hotspur at White Hart Lane. Southend defended bravely against Spurs, taking the London club to extra time before Jermain Defoe scored the only goal of the game with five minutes of extra time left, although replays later proved he was offside.

Top scorer Freddy Eastwood was to Wolverhampton Wanderers for £1.5 million in the close season, in a move that struck a huge blow to Southend's hopes of an automatic return to the second tier.

Final league table

Results
Southend United's score comes first

Legend

Football League Championship

FA Cup

League Cup

Squad

Left club during season

References

Southend United F.C. seasons
Southend United